Paul Almásy (29 May 1906 in Budapest – 23 September  2003 in Jouars-Pontchartrain) was a French photojournalist of Hungarian origin who lived mainly in Paris and worked worldwide in a career spanning over 50 years.

Early life 
Paul Gross Almásy was born on 29 May 1906 in Budapest and grew up there. At 17, he left Hungary and studied political science in Vienna, Munich and Heidelberg in 1924 to prepare for a diplomatic career but was drawn to journalism.

Career 
In 1925, he accepted a job as a correspondent in Morocco during the Republic of the Rif. Almásy then became a photojournalist and, from 1929 to 1931, wrote his first reports from Rome for the German press agency Wehr illustrated with his photographic work.
 
To illustrate his articles, he took the first photographs in 1935 during a trip to South America. In the years that followed, countless reports from all parts of the world followed; for example, in 1936, for the Berliner Illustrirte Zeitung, he crossed the Sahara by car. He undertook several trips to Africa in the late 1930s and Illustrierte on the training of Finnish athletes for the 1936 Summer Olympics. During the Second World War, he covered events from France, Belgium and the Netherlands for the Swiss press between 1940 and 1943.
 
After the war, Paris became the focus of his life while travelling; for example, in 1950, he travelled to Indochina. From 1952 Almásy worked on behalf of United Nations institutions such as UNICEF, World Health Organization and UNESCO, for which he traveled as an accredited employee. His graphic reports on the racial problem in South Africa in 1953, the drug problem in Asia, the life of the Eskimos and on Tierra del Fuego in 1962 which made him one of the most traveled photojournalists.
 
He was a founding member along with Albert Plécy of the photographic group Gens d'Images that annually promotes the Niépce Prize and Prix Nadar. In 1956, Almásy took French citizenship. From 1972 to 1989, he held professorships in Paris at the Sorbonne University and at the Center de Perfectionnement des Journalistes.
 
In 1963, Argentina issued a postage stamp for the fight against hunger featuring one of his photographs, and in 1965, he published "Le monde a thirst", a report on the lack of water in the world. In 1995, Paul Almásy sold his color photographs to Branded Entertainment Network (Corbis), the image bank founded by Bill Gates.

Work 
Almásy's subjects were people from all walks of life: "People like you and me", but also ethnic and social fringe groups, people from the upper and lower classes. Whether taken in a severe or bleak, documentary, cheerful or even funny context, the people in his pictures always retain their dignity. In his volume "Paris", one senses an endearing approach to portraying life on the street or the world of artists; his style is sometimes reminiscent of André Kertész and resembles the paintings of Robert Doisneau in his witty and mischievous observations on the fringes of world history.

Almásy also associated with the nobility and bohemian society and documented their festivals and rituals. He was personally known to Otto von Habsburg and Baron Rothschild. Over the decades, he made interviews and reports with important people of contemporary history such as Menachem Begin, Nikita Khrushchev, Dwight D. Eisenhower, Charles de Gaulle, Benito Mussolini, Jawaharlal Nehru and the Shah of Persia Mohammad Reza Pahlavi. Almásy has taken remarkable portraits of many other personalities from public life, which have entered the collective memory - artists of various provenance are to be mentioned here as examples: Salvador Dalí, Alberto Giacometti, André Breton, Colette, Jean Cocteau, Jacques Prévert, Man Ray, Romy Schneider and Alain Delon and Yves Saint Laurent.
 
As an "onlooker of world history" - a discreet, reserved, but never voyeuristic observer - of his time, he worked on an "archive of the world". His oeuvre can be viewed as such if you relate it to the subject of "human beings" because all continents, many different cultures, all social classes, and all human moods are represented in his work, which depicts the most turbulent times of the last century from the 1930s to the late 1960s. According to his own statement, he had worked in every country in the world "except Mongolia". Almásy characterizes his way of working with an incredible understatement: “It was always chance that decided everything. I never searched – my camera was the viewfinder, I was just the finder.” With this attitude, Almásy “found” quite a few images, which, in his opinion, say "more than a long report" in a single shot. Although not his primary aim, many of his images are characterized by breathtaking authenticity and simple beauty, revealing a very discreetly observing humanist behind the camera.
 
After his time as a reporter, his work was wrongly only known to specialists for a long time. The processing of his archive, which contains 120,000 negatives, is in the hands of akg-images and is far from over; what has been published in recent years shows, however, that the task here is to snatch the work of a significant figure in the history of photography from oblivion. In this context, in addition to more recent book publications, there was also an extensive exhibition in the Frankfurt Museum of Modern Art around the turn of the millennium, which was followed by others in Munich's Haus der Kunst and also in Budapest. In the spring of 2006, parts of his early work were in the Art and Culture Foundation Opel Villas Rüsselsheim in Rüsselsheim am Main.

Death 
23 September  2003, Almásy died at the age of 97 on his estate in Jouars-Pontchartrain near Paris. His estate contains around 120,000 negatives.

Awards and honours 
In 1993, Almásy was made a knight of the Ordre national du Mérite.

References

External links 

 ArtNet: Paul Almasy
 The big picture: Paul Almasy and the 'grey sisters' of Paris. The Guardian

French photographers
French journalists
Hungarian photographers
Hungarian journalists
Photojournalists
1906 births
2003 deaths